Dretelj is a village in Bosnia and Herzegovina. According to the 1991 census, the village is located in the municipality of Čapljina.

Demographics 
According to the 2013 census, its population was 569.

References

External links 
 Čapljina Portal umrli

Villages in the Federation of Bosnia and Herzegovina
Populated places in Čapljina